A robber is someone who steals.

Robber(s) or The Robber(s) may also refer to:

 Robber (TV series), a 2008 South Korean TV series
 The Robber, a 2010 German film directed by Benjamin Heisenberg
 The Robbers, a 1782 play by Friedrich Schiller
 The Robbers (film), a 1962 Spanish crime film directed by Francisco Rovira Beleta
 "Robbers" (The 1975 song), 2014
 "Robbers" (Youngblood Hawke song), 2017
 Die Räuber (opera) or The Robbers, a 1957 opera by Giselher Klebe

See also 
 Brycinus or robber tetras, a genus of ray-finned fish in the family Alestiidae
 David "Robber" Lewis (1790–1820), American criminal
 Robber barons (disambiguation)
 Robbery (disambiguation)